Come On Over to the Other Side is the second studio album released by the Norwegian band The National Bank.

Track listing
Home
Cubicle Man
Family
Let Go
Taste of Me
From That Day to This  
The Balladeer
Something New
Styrofoam
Some Paper on the Bedroom Floor
 Make It Burn

External links
 The National Bank's Official Homepage

2008 albums
The National Bank (band) albums